Mary–Ann Eisel (born November 25, 1946) is an American former tennis player. She was the US Open mixed doubles champion in 1968.

Personal life
Eisel was born in St. Louis, Missouri, was educated in the Ladue School District, and went on to Washington University in St. Louis, where she competed on the men's tennis team.  In 1969, she married fellow tennis player Peter Curtis. Following their divorce, she married Don Beattie on May 12, 1972.

In addition to her tennis career, Eisel was an amateur golfer.

Career
In 1964, Eisel won the US girls' 18 championship.  In the same year, she won the Irish National doubles title with Justina Bricka. 

Eisel reached the finals of the 1967 women's doubles U.S. National Championships at Forrest Hills with Donna Floyd, losing in three sets against Rosemary Casals and Billie Jean King.

In 1968, she won the US Open mixed doubles with Peter Curtis, defeating Tory Fretz and Gerry Perry in straight sets In 1969, she won the singles title at the Surrey Grass Court Championships, defeating Judy Tegart in three sets. She won the doubles title at the 1971 British Hard Court Championships with Françoise Dürr, defeating Margaret Court and Evonne Goolagong in the final.

In 1968 and 1970, she played for the US Federation Cup team, reaching the semifinals of the World Group on both occasions, and compiled a record of five wins and four losses.

In 1974, she was a team member of the Detroit Loves, which won the Central Section Championship in the inaugural season of the World Team Tennis league in the United States. In 1975, she played for the Hawaii Leis.

In total, she competed at Wimbledon nine times.

Grand Slam finals

Doubles (1 runner-up)

Mixed doubles (1 title)

References

External links

 
 
 

1946 births
Living people
American female tennis players
Grand Slam (tennis) champions in mixed doubles
Tennis players from St. Louis
US Open (tennis) champions
Washington University Bears men's tennis players